The 2017 Thai FA Cup is the 24th season of a Thailand's knockout football competition. It was sponsored by Chang, and known as the Chang FA Cup for sponsorship purposes. The tournament is organized by the Football Association of Thailand. 74 clubs were accepted into the tournament, and it began with the qualification round on 5 April 2017, and concluded with the final on 25 November 2017. The winner would have qualified for the 2018 AFC Champions League preliminary round 2 and the 2018 Thailand Champions Cup.

Calendar

Results

Qualification round 
Qualification round for teams currently playing in the 2017 Thai League 2, 2017 Thai League 3, 2017 Thai League 4 and 2017 Thai Football Amateur Tournament. Qualification round had drawn on 17 March 2017 by FA Thailand. Every match in this round was held on 5 April 2017.

First round 
The first round will be featured by ten clubs which were the winners of the qualification round and fifty-four clubs from 2017 Thai League 1, 2017 Thai League 2, 2017 Thai League 3, 2017 Thai League 4 and 2017 Thai Football Amateur Tournament. First round had drawn on 5 June 2017 by FA Thailand. The first round was held on 21 June 2017.

Second round 
The second round will be featured by thirty-two clubs which were the winners of the first round. Second round had drawn on 13 July 2017 by FA Thailand. The second round was held on 2 August 2017.

Third round 
The third round will be featured by sixteen clubs which were the winners of the second round; including eight clubs from T1, seven clubs from T2, and one club from T4. The draw for the third round was held on 12 September 2017, at the Rajpruek club in Bangkok. All matches of this round was held on 27 September 2017.

Quarter-finals 
The quarter-finals will be featured by eight clubs which were the winners of the third round; including five clubs from T1, two clubs from T2, and one club from T4. Quarter-finals had drawn on 11 October 2017 at the Rajpruek club in Bangkok. All matches of this round was held on 18 October 2017.

Semi-finals 
The semi-finals will be featured by four clubs which were the winners of the quarter-finals round, including three clubs from T1 and one club from T4. Semi-finals had drawn on 19 October 2017 at the Rajpruek club in Bangkok. All matches of this round was held on 1 November 2017.

Final 

The final will be featured by the winners of the semi-finals round, both were the clubs from T1. A match of this round was held on 25 November 2017.

Top goalscorers
As of 25 November 2017 from official website.

See also
 2017 Thai League
 2017 Thai League 2
 2017 Thai League 3
 2017 Thai League 4
 2017 Thailand Amateur League
 2017 Thai League Cup
 2017 Thailand Champions Cup

References

 http://www.thailandsusu.com/webboard/index.php?topic=381708.0

External links
 Official
 Thai FA cup snapshot from Thai League official website.
 2017 Thai FA Cup official rules from FA Thailand official website.
 2017 Thai FA Cup official application form from FA Thailand official website.
 2017 Thai FA Cup players and staffs identification form for each teams from FA Thailand official website.
 Round of 64 drawing from FA Thailand official website.

2017 in Thai football cups
Thailand FA Cup
Thailand FA Cup
Thai FA Cup seasons